Waldyr Calheiros Novaes, (July 29, 1923 – November 30, 2013) was a Brazilian prelate of the Catholic Church.

Waldyr Calheiros Novaes was born in Murici, Alagoas, and ordained a priest on July 25, 1948.  Novaes was appointed auxiliary bishop of the Diocese of São Sebastião do Rio de Janeiro as well as Titular Bishop of Mulia on February 25, 1964, and was ordained bishop on May 1, 1964. Novaes was appointed archbishop of the Diocese of Barra do Piraí-Volta Redonda on October 20, 1966, where Novaes served until his retirement on November 17, 1999.

He died November 30, 2013, at a hospital, of a lung infection.

See also
Diocese of ão Sebastião do Rio de Janeiro
Diocese of Barra do Piraí-Volta Redonda

References

External links
Catholic-Hierarchy
Archdiocese of São Sebastião do Rio de Janeiro 
Diocese of Barra do Piraí-Volta Redonda 

20th-century Roman Catholic bishops in Brazil
1923 births
2013 deaths
Roman Catholic bishops of Barra do Piraí-Volta Redonda